OOL may refer to:

Science and technology
 Object-oriented language, a programming paradigm
 OoL (Origins of life), Abiogenesis
 Out-of-the-loop performance problem, a consequence of automation

Others
 Gold Coast Airport (IATA code) in Gold Coast, Queensland, Australia
 Olivia O'Leary, Irish journalist, writer and current affairs presenter
 Optimum Online, an Internet service provider in the United States